Do Han-se (born September 25, 1997), also known mononymously as Hanse, is a South Korean rapper, singer and songwriter. He debuted as a member of South Korean group Victon in 2016. He debuted with his solo album Blaze on September 25, 2021.

Career

2016–present: Debut with Victon 
Do joined Plan A Entertainment as a trainee in 2016, and later that year was announced as a member of their new boy group, initially referred to as "Plan A Boys". He participated in their pre-debut show Me and 7 Men, before he debuted in Plan A's new group, officially named Victon in November 2016. Since the group's first EP, Do has songwriting credits on the majority of their songs.

2020–present: Solo work 
In January 2021, for Victon's first full-length album Voice: The Future is Now, Do released the solo song "Where is Love?" which was also self-composed.

In March, Do appeared alongside groupmate Heo Chan as a model for designer Jang Yoon-kyung's brand SETSETSET at the Fall and Winter Seoul Fashion Week, after both appearing as models in the Spring and Summer Seoul Fashion Week of 2020.

Originally confirmed in October 2020 as a solo mixtape release, Do released his first solo album, Blaze, on September 25 as a digital album, with the dual title tracks "Take Over" and "Public Enemy". Do participated in the production of all six tracks on the album. While the album was a digital release, a Kit version of the album was released on October 5, which sold 7,589 copies in its first month of release.

In October, Do, alongside group members Kang Seung-sik, Heo Chan, and Lim Se-jun, participated in a charity project with Good Neighbors for the International Day for the Eradication of Poverty.

In March 2022, Do featured in the song "Seventh Floor" from Korean indie artist Kim Mi-jeong's EP Volume Up!. In June, he featured on Chu Seo-jun's song "Sippin'", from the album Now is Sober.

Discography

Extended plays

Singles

As lead artist

As featured artist

Songwriting 
Do is credited on the majority of Victon's discography, and has been credited on 62 songs through KOMCA as of September 2022. For the group's single "Time of Sorrow", his lyrics were described as "poetic and refined", reflecting an "emotional side" of him.

Filmography

Notes

References

External links
 

Living people
1997 births
Victon members
21st-century South Korean singers
IST Entertainment artists
South Korean male idols
South Korean male rappers
South Korean pop singers
South Korean male singer-songwriters
Musicians from Incheon